The Creek South Beach is a 90-room motel located on Collins Avenue and 23rd Street in the American city of Miami Beach, Florida.

The motel's building is an example of Miami Modern architecture (MiMo) and is situated just north of the Art Deco District, in the Collins Park neighborhood and the CANDO (Cultural Arts Neighborhood District Overlay) in Miami Beach.  The motel's building is one of the few remaining examples of post-World War II motel architecture in Miami and the only example in Miami Beach's South Beach neighborhood.

The property has been featured as an architecturally significant structure in the book on MiMo architecture MiMo: Miami Modern Revealed.

History and design
The Creek South Beach (originally named The Ankara Motel) was built in 1954 by the architecture firm of Reiff & Feldman. Designed in a classic motel or googie-style "L" shape, "the central element is a radically cantilevered-raked delta-wing roof, perched lightly as a paper airplane atop a triangular glass lobby." The lobby design sets the tone for architectural elements throughout – zigzagged lines, floating staircases encased in brick and a central pylon overlooking the waterway.

The popularity of the property rose and fell with Miami Beach's economic tides changing hands and names many times over. By the turn of the 21st century, the motel was operated as a youth hostel under the name of Banana Bungalow and suffered from severe neglect and poor maintenance.

In 2003, the property was purchased by Ken Fields, who renamed it The Creek South Beach and turned the motel into the first art hotel on Miami Beach. Young artists from across the country were invited to design individual rooms, re-christened The Creek: Signature Series. The project managers for the Signature Series were Bo Sundius of Bunch Design and Tim Ronan of SBK Global, with curatorial input and coordinator of artists' installations from artist Ellen Jong. The hotel re-opened in time for Art Basel Miami Beach 2002, hosting guests including Jeffrey Deitch of Deitch Projects. The Creek South Beach won Best Hotel in Miami New Times Best Of 2003.

Signature Series artists

UNDO (art collective) Ninos Jugando
Inkheads (graffiti collective) Inkredible Hieroglyphics
Justine Harari (photographer and film maker) Lights
Brendan Carney (fine artist) Surveying Surveillance
Camella Ehlke (founder of Triple Five Soul and hotelier) Camo-Clash
Kenzo Minami (contemporary artist) Morgenröthe
Shepard Fairey (contemporary artist) Obey
Justin Luke (founder of www.audiovisualarts.org) Ouro Puro
Kate Ruth and Brooke Geahan Honeymoon Suite
Devon Dikeou (publisher and art collector) Reading Room
Kiku and Che Jen (Barn Stormers) Americana
Oliver Lutz (contemporary artist) Frustom: Sniper
Hisako Ichiki (architect) 365 Days
Marina Zurkow (graphic artist) Instructions for Sleeping
Hilary Read (brand and environment designer) Message in a Bottle
Howard Fonda (artist and teacher at the School of the Art Institute of Chicago) Plato's Cave
Donald Hearn (contemporary artist) Dazzle Painting
Level Design (architecture firm) Home

Artist-designed rooms

In film and television
The Creek South Beach has been featured as a back drop for several films and television productions over the years, most notably the films The Specialist (1994), Bad Boys (1995), Transporter 2 (2005) and several episodes of the television series Miami Vice.

See also

 List of motels
 Miami Beach Architectural District

References

1954 establishments in Florida
Hotel buildings completed in 1954
Hotels in Miami Beach, Florida
Miami Modern architecture
Motels in the United States
Hostels